Athletics in Germany is governed by Deutscher Leichtathletik-Verband founded on 29 January 1898.

All-time top lists

The lists are updated as of February 22, 2013, and regard to the 21 individual Olympic specialities. For the high jump, the pole vault, the long jump, the triple jump and the shot put, the performances also include the indoor competitions (measures are identified by (i) in the tables).

100 metres

Men

Women

200 metres

Men

Women

Pole vault

Men

Women

See also
Deutscher Leichtathletik-Verband
German records in athletics
East Germany national athletics team

References

External links
 Deutscher Leichtathletik-Verband official site
 National Lists of Germany (Men)
 National Lists of Germany (Women)

 
Germany
Sport in Germany by sport
Germany